Object Technology International (OTI) was founded in Ottawa, Ontario (Canada) in 1988 and acquired by IBM in 1996. OTI, in conjunction with the IBM development lab in Cary, NC, developed the VisualAge line Smalltalk and Java development tools that eventually culminated in the open source Eclipse tool platform and integrated development environment (IDE).

OTI continued to operate with many of the same employees as it did when it was purchased by IBM until 2003–2004, when it was gradually disbanded as a distinct entity and its remaining employees absorbed into IBM.

References

External links
Dave Thomas - Travels with Smalltalk: an account of the story of Smalltalk from one of the founders of OTI
Planet OTI  Aggregator for former OTI employee blogs.

Software companies of Canada
Eclipse (software)
1988 establishments in Canada
1988 establishments in Ontario
Software companies established in 1988
Companies established in 1988